Senirkent is a town and center of Lakes Region and district of Isparta Province in the Mediterranean region of Turkey. The population is 6,303 as of 2010.The mayor is Hüseyin Baykal (MHP).

References

Populated places in Isparta Province
Districts of Isparta Province
Towns in Turkey